Amalda depressa, common name the depressed ancilla, is a species of a small sea snail, a marine gastropod mollusc in the family Ancillariidae.

Description
The length of the shell varies between 11 mm and 26 mm.

Distribution
This marine species is endemic to and occurs off New Zealand.

References

 Powell A W B, New Zealand Mollusca, William Collins Publishers Ltd, Auckland, New Zealand 1979 
 Sowerby G.B. II (1859). Monograph of the genus Ancillaria. Thesaurus Conchyliorum 3 page(s): Species 28, pl. 211, fig. 3.

External links
 

depressa
Gastropods of New Zealand
Gastropods described in 1859